Humbert I (950 – 1042 or 1047  1048), better known as Humbert the White-Handed or , was the founder of the House of Savoy. Of obscure origins, his service to the Holy Roman Emperors Henry II and Conrad II was rewarded with the counties of Maurienne and Aosta and lands in Valais, all at the expense of local bishops and archbishops; the territory came to be known as the county of Savoy.

Biography

Family
Humbert was the son of Amadeus, who may or may not have preceded him as count of Maurienne. His brother was Bishop Otto of Belley. Humbert is the progenitor of the dynasty known as the House of Savoy. The origins of this dynasty are unknown, but Humbert's ancestors are variously said to have come from Saxony, Burgundy or Provence. Given Humbert's close connections with Rudolf III of Burgundy, it is likely that his family was Burgundian, and was descended either from the dukes of Vienne, or from a Burgundian aristocratic family (such as the Guigonids, ancestors of the counts of Albon). It is also likely that Humbert was related to Ermengarde of Burgundy, second wife of Rudolf III.

Humbert initially held lands around Belley and in the county of Sermorens, before gaining lands in Aosta and Valais.

Humbert and the empire
After Rudolf III's death (1032), Humbert I swore fealty to Emperor Conrad II. He supported Conrad II in his campaigns against Odo II, Count of Blois, and Aribert, Archbishop of Milan. In return, Conrad II appointed Humbert count of Savoy and granted him Maurienne, Chablais and perhaps Tarentaise. These imperial grants to a loyal supporter secured key passes through the Alps, controlling trade between Italy and Western Europe, which would be the core of Savoy power for centuries.

Marriage and children

Humbert married Ancelie (Auxilia or Ancilia). She may have been Ancilla of Aoste, the daughter of vir illustris Anselme of Aoste or Ancilla of Lenzburg, the daughter of the master of ceremonies of Burgundy. Alternatively, Ancilla may have been a daughter of Anselm and Aldiud, and thus a member of a northern Italian dynasty known as the Anselmids.
With his wife, Humbert had at least four sons:
Amadeus I (died 1056), Count of Savoy, successor
Aymon (died 1054 or 1055), Bishop of Sion
Burchard (died 1068 or 1069), Archbishop of Lyon
Otto (died c. 1057), Count of Savoy, successor of his brother

Some authors believe that he had additional sons.

Death

Humbert is often said to have died c. 1047/8 at Hermillon, a town in the Maurienne region of present-day Savoie, France. More recently, it has been suggested that he died by 1042.

Notes

References
 
C. W. Previté-Orton, The Early History of the House of Savoy (1000-1233) (Cambridge, 1912), accessible online at: archive.org 
S. Hellmann, Die Grafen von Savoyen und das Reich: bis zum Ende der staufischen Periode (Innsbruck, 1900), accessible online (but without page numbers) at: Genealogie Mittelalter
Die Urkunden der burgundischen Rudolfinger, ed. T. Schieffer, MGH DD Burg (Munich, 1977), accessible online at: Monumenta Germaniae Historia
C. Ducourthial, Géographie du pouvoir en pays de Savoie au tournant de l'an Mil, in C. Guilleré, J-M. Poisson, L. Ripart and C. Ducourthial, eds., Le royaume de Bourgogne autour de l'an mil (Chambéry, 2008), pp. 207–246.
Laurent Ripart, Les fondements idéologiques du pouvoir des comtes de la maison de Savoie (de la fin du Xe siècle au début du XIIIe siècle (unpublished PhD thesis, Université de Nice, 1999).

External links
History of House of Savoy
Humbert Weißhand, Graf von Savoyen (in German)
Humbert Biancamano, Conte di Savoia (in Italian)

11th-century Counts of Savoy
Counts of Aosta

980s births
1040s deaths
Year of birth uncertain
Year of death uncertain
Place of birth unknown